The Wanderer is a 1913 American silent drama film directed by  D. W. Griffith and produced by the Biograph Company. Prints of the film exist in private collections.

Cast

 Henry B. Walthall as The Wanderer
 Charles Hill Mailes as The Father
 Christy Cabanne - The Brother
 Kate Bruce as The Old Woman
 Lionel Barrymore as The Male Lover
 Claire McDowell as The Female Lover
 Kate Toncray as The Other Mother
 Frank Opperman as The Other Father
 Mae Marsh as The Other Parents' Daughter, as an Adult
 John T. Dillon as The Crafty Merchant
 Walter Miller as The Other Man
 Charles West as The Friar

See also
 D. W. Griffith filmography
 Lionel Barrymore filmography

References

External links

1913 films
1913 drama films
1913 short films
Silent American drama films
American silent short films
American black-and-white films
Biograph Company films
Films directed by D. W. Griffith
1910s American films